Erik Szilvássy is a Hungarian Greco-Roman wrestler. He won one of the bronze medals in the 87 kg event at the 2019 European Wrestling Championships held in Bucharest, Romania.

In 2021, he won the silver medal in the men's 97 kg event at the Matteo Pellicone Ranking Series 2021 held in Rome, Italy.

In 2022, he competed in the 87 kg event at the European Wrestling Championships in Budapest, Hungary where he was eliminated in his first match.

References

External links 
 

Living people
Year of birth missing (living people)
Place of birth missing (living people)
Hungarian male sport wrestlers
European Wrestling Championships medalists